Mario Daniel Pinedo Chore (born April 9, 1964 in La Paz) is a retired Bolivian footballer who played as a midfielder for the Bolivia national football team in the 1994 FIFA World Cup.

Club career
He has played for Oriente Petrolero, The Strongest, Blooming and Real Santa Cruz.

International career
Pinedo earned 22 caps between 1985 and 1994 and was a squad member at the 1994 FIFA World Cup for the Bolivia national team.

References

External links

playerhistory 

1964 births
Living people
Footballers from La Paz
Association football midfielders
Bolivian footballers
Club Destroyers players
Oriente Petrolero players
Club Blooming players
Bolivia international footballers
1994 FIFA World Cup players